John Patterson Lundy (Danville, Pennsylvania, February 3, 1823 - Philadelphia, December 11, 1892) was an American Episcopalian pastor and writer. During his diaconate, he was chaplain of Sing Sing prison.

Works
 Monumental Christianity, Or, the Art and Symbolism of the Primitive Church 1876
 A Review of Bishop Hopkins' Bible View of Slavery, by a Presbyter of the Church in Philadelphia

References

External links
Monumental Christianity, Or, the Art and Symbolism of the Primitive Church 1876 pdf

1823 births
1892 deaths
American Episcopal priests
People from Danville, Pennsylvania
19th-century American Episcopalians
19th-century American clergy